The Norwegian Press Directorate was a Norwegian government agency within the Ministry of Culture and Enlightenment between 1940 and 1945. Anders Beggerud was the director during the entire Second World War.

References

Norway in World War II
Nazi propaganda organizations
Defunct government agencies of Norway
News agencies based in Norway